Peruvians of European descent, also known as White Peruvians. Traditionally, this group had been more dominant in the political, commercial, and diplomatic sectors of Peruvian society. According to the most recent 2017 census where ethnic self-identification was used, it makes up about 5.9% of the total population aged 12 years and above of Peru.

History 
European immigration to Peru began with the Spanish colonization of the Americas and continued during the Republic of Peru in the 19th century with the immigration of people from other countries of Europe (especially, Spain, Italy, Portugal, France, England and Germany, among others).

Spain

Spanish settlement of Peru began in the early 1530s (continuing until 1821 as a viceroyalty of Spain) and continues to the present day. Spanish explorer Francisco Pizarro founded the first Spanish settlement in Peru, San Miguel de Piura in July 1532. According to historian Napoleón Cieza Burga, the conquistador Diego de Almagro founded the second Spanish settlement of Trujillo in November 1534 and one of the first cities in the Americas founded by the Spanish conquistadors. calling it "Villa Trujillo de Nueva Castilla" (Trujillo of New Castile) after Trujillo, the birthplace of Francisco Pizarro.

Spanish cultural influence is the most notable of all European cultural groups in Peruvian culture. Spanish heritage has left an indelible mark in the country and signs of this cultural exchange can be found everywhere, from the official language, the dominant Roman Catholic religion, bullfighting, musical genres to the local culinary styles.

Britain

One cultural influence is Inca Kola, a soft drink that was created in Peru in 1935 by an English immigrant Joseph Robinson Lindley. In 1911, in Rímac, one of Lima's oldest and most traditional neighborhoods, an English family began a small bottling company under their family name, Lindley. In 1928, the company was formally chartered in Peru as Corporación José R. Lindley S.A., whereupon Joseph R. Lindley became its first General Manager. Today it is still a family business with the great-grandson Johnny Lindley Suarez being the current president.

Geographical distribution

According to the 2017 census 5.9% or 1.3 million (1,336,931) people 12 years of age and above self-identified as white. There were 619,402 (5.5%) males and 747,528 (6.3%) females. This was the first time a question for ethnic origins had been asked. The regions with the highest proportion of self-identified whites were in La Libertad Region (10.5%), Tumbes Region and Lambayeque Region (9.0% each), Piura Region (8.1%), Callao (7.7%), Cajamarca Region (7.5%), Lima Province (7.2%) and Lima Region (6.0%).

Origins
The following European ethnic backgrounds form the majority of white Peruvians: Spanish, Italian, German (includes Poles due to Partitions of Poland), French, British, Croatian, and Irish. Peru is also home to some 2600 Jews whose ancestors came mainly from Germany, Poland, Hungary, Latvia, Lithuania, Ukraine, Moldova and Russia, among others.

See also 

 White Latin American
 Croatian Peruvians
 Italian Peruvians
 French Peruvians
 German Peruvians
 Spanish immigration to Peru
 History of the Jews in Peru

References 

 
Ethnic groups in Peru
European diaspora in South America